Eusebius McKaiser (born 28 March) is a South African political analyst, journalist, and broadcaster, who is a prolific public intellectual. Among others, he has written for the Mail & Guardian, the Sunday Times, Foreign Policy, the Guardian, the New York Times, and the Business Day, where he used to have a weekly column. He gained prominence as a Radio 702 talk show host, and has also written three books about South African politics and society.

Life and career 
He was born in Grahamstown, Eastern Cape, where his working-class family lived in a coloured township. He attended St Mary's Primary School and Graeme College, and matriculated from the latter in 1996. From 1997, he attended Rhodes University, graduating with distinction with a bachelor's degree in law and philosophy, an Honours degree, and, in 2003, a master's degree in philosophy, with a thesis on moral objectivity. Between 2005 and 2006, he attended the University of Oxford on a Rhodes Scholarship, where he did doctoral research – never completed – under Ralph Wedgwood and John Broome, also in moral philosophy. He was also an Oppenheimer Memorial Trust Scholar.

Thereafter, he worked as an associate consultant at McKinsey & Company, and by 2012 was a political and social analyst at the Wits Centre for Ethics and at the University of Johannesburg Centre for the Study of Democracy. The first radio show he hosted at Radio 702 was a weekly late-night talk show called Politics and Morality, which was running by late 2010. He hosted the SABC 3 current affairs programme Interface until 2011, and later anchored 702's Talk@9 show on week nights.

When Power FM launched on 18 June 2013, he entered as host of Power Talk, a three-hour weekday morning talk show. In October 2014, he left Power FM  – according to the station, due to insoluble disagreements between him and the station – and returned to Radio 702 in July 2016, taking over from Redi Thlabi with a weekday morning talk slot. According to the Mail & Guardian, through his radio work, McKaiser had "etched himself on the national psyche" by 2013. Pumla Dineo Gqola later said that his morning show on 702, the Eusebius McKaiser Show, "shaped everyday dialogue and, with it, the culture of our time," and compliment McKaiser's "heartbreaking, illuminating and often joyful intellectual work."

He left Radio 702 in June 2020, apparently because the station had not been prepared to dedicate adequate resources to the production of his show. He now hosts a podcast called In the Ring and, on YouTube, an Exclusive Books show about books called Cover to Cover.

Bibliography 

 McKaiser, Eusebius (2012). A Bantu in My Bathroom!: Debating Race, Sexuality and Other Uncomfortable South African Topics. Bookstorm. .
 McKaiser, Eusebius (2014). Could I Vote DA?: A Voter's Dilemma. Bookstorm. .
 McKaiser, Eusebius (2016). Run Racist Run: Journeys into the Heart of Racism. Bookstorm. .

Awards 

 2010: Mail & Guardian's 200 Young South Africans list
 2011: World Masters Debate Champion
 2012: Rhodes University Emerging Old Rhodian Award

References

External links 

 Mail & Guardian articles
 Business Day articles
 Sunday Times articles
 Foreign Policy articles
 Cover to Cover episodes
 Academic publications at ResearchGate
 "A Bantu in my bathroom!" (excerpt from A Bantu in My Bathroom)
 "Affirmative action: a force for good or racism’s friend?" (excerpt from A Bantu in My Bathroom)

Alumni of Graeme College
South African Rhodes Scholars
South African writers
People from Makhanda, Eastern Cape
Rhodes University alumni
Living people
South African radio presenters
South African journalists
Year of birth uncertain
Year of birth missing (living people)